Ghulam Rasul, also written Ghulam Rasool, is a male Muslim given name. It may refer to

Ghulam Rasool Gangi, 19th century Uyghur
Ghulam Rasul Raja, army officer in British India/Pakistan
Maulana Ghulam Rasool Mehr (1893–1971), Muslim scholar and political activist in British India/Pakistan
Ghulam Rasool Kar (1921–2015), Indian politician from Jammu and Kashmir
Ghulam Rasool Jamaati (born 1923), Pakistani Islamic scholar
Ghulam Rasool Santosh (1929–1997), Kashmiri Indian painter
Ghulam Rasool (Telugu journalist) (died 1992), journalist said to have been killed by Andhra Pradesh Police
Chaudhry Ghulam Rasool (1931–1991), Pakistani educationist and field hockey Olympian
Ghulam Rasool (footballer) (born 1962), Pakistani footballer
Abdullah Gulam Rasoul (born c. 1973), Afghan held in Guantanamo
Ghulam Rasool Birhamani (died 2010), murdered Pakistani journalist
Ghulam Rasul (swimmer) (born 1935), Pakistani Olympic swimmer